Justin James Skinner (born 17 September 1972) is an English former footballer who played as a defender.

He started out as a trainee with Wimbledon but made only two appearances in the Premier League, and he was sent away on loan to Bournemouth and Wycombe Wanderers. In 1996, he was sold to Aylesbury United, spending two seasons there, before moving to Gravesend & Northfleet. He had two spells with the club, split by a period when he was out of football. After spending eight years at the club, he moved to Margate.

References

External links

Career information
ESPNsoccernet: Justin Skinner

1972 births
Living people
English footballers
People from Dorking
Footballers from Surrey
Association football defenders
Wimbledon F.C. players
AFC Bournemouth players
Wycombe Wanderers F.C. players
Aylesbury United F.C. players
Ebbsfleet United F.C. players
Margate F.C. players
Premier League players
English Football League players
National League (English football) players
Isthmian League players